Saturn Award for Best DVD Classic Film Release is an award given by the Academy of Science Fiction, Fantasy and Horror Films to each film considered to be "classic", at least through the present time that each film is nominated for this award. The following is a list of winners of this award:

Best Classic Film DVD Release